Pedro Portocarrero (died 1526) was a Roman Catholic prelate who served as Archbishop of Granada (1525–1526) and Bishop of Ciudad Rodrigo (1523–1525).

Biography
Pedro Portocarrero was born in Spain. On 31 Dec 1523, he was appointed during the papacy of Pope Clement VII as Bishop of Ciudad Rodrigo. In 1524, he was consecrated bishop. 
On 26 Jun 1525, he was appointed during the papacy of Pope Clement VII as Archbishop of Granada.
He served as Archbishop of Granada until his death on 5 Jun 1526.

References

External links and additional sources
 (for Chronology of Bishops) 
 (for Chronology of Bishops) 
 (for Chronology of Bishops) 
 (for Chronology of Bishops) 

16th-century Roman Catholic bishops in Spain
Bishops appointed by Pope Clement VII
1526 deaths
Archbishops of Granada